Gerald Marks (October 13, 1900 – January 27, 1997) was an American composer from Saginaw, Michigan. He was best known for the song "All of Me" which he co-wrote with Seymour Simons and has been recorded about 2,000 times. He also wrote the songs "That's What I Want for Christmas" for the film Stowaway starring Shirley Temple, and "Is It True What They Say About Dixie" recorded by Al Jolson and Rudy Vallee.

The success of his song "All of Me" led him to become a member of ASCAP, and he remained active in
the organization for decades, serving on its board of directors from 1970 to 1981.

Gerald Marks was married to Edna Berger, a successful newspaper woman and labor organizer.  She preceded him in death.

References
 David A. Jasen Tin Pan Alley AN ENCYCLOPEDIA OF THE GOLDEN AGE OF AMERICAN SONG (2003), Routledge Publishers,

External links
 
 
 
 Entry at bmi.com

1900 births
1997 deaths
Jewish American songwriters
American male composers
Musicians from Saginaw, Michigan
Songwriters from Michigan
ASCAP composers and authors
20th-century American composers
20th-century American male musicians
20th-century American Jews
American male songwriters